Issa Mohamed (born 1965) is an Emirati former cyclist. He competed in the road race at the 1988 Summer Olympics.

References

External links
 

1965 births
Living people
Emirati male cyclists
Olympic cyclists of the United Arab Emirates
Cyclists at the 1988 Summer Olympics
Place of birth missing (living people)